Thiemo de Bakker won the title, beating top seed Víctor Estrella Burgos 7–6(7–1), 4–6, 6–3

Seeds

Draw

Finals

Top half

Bottom half

References
 Main Draw
 Qualifying Draw

Monterrey Challenger - Singles